The Jänner Rallye, also known as the Internationale Jänner Rallye, is an international rally racing event based in Freistadt in northern Austria. The event is the season opening round of the European Rally Championship, the Austrian Rally Championship and the Czech Rally Championship. Translated from German the name means January Rally. The mid-winter calendar position means the rally is frequently snow-bound with the surface a mix of ice and asphalt.

History
First run in 1969 as the Casino Rallye, it quickly became a feature of the Austrian championship and soon joined the European championship although only in the lower co-efficient category. Achim Warmbold became the first multiple winner of the event in 1973, but Franz Wittmann, Sr. came to dominate the rally. He won the rally nine times in a ten-year period from 1975 to 1984, including six straight wins in Audis as the 4WD era dawned.

The rally ended in 1986 because of environmental concerns. The rally returned in 2000 and in 2003 Wittman won the rally for a tenth time. In recent times honours have been shared between Austrian and Czech drivers, reflecting the dual national championship status the rally has acquired. Raimund Baumschlager, Václav Pech, Jr. and Jan Kopecký have claimed multiple victories.

In 2012, the rally rejoined the European Championship after having dropped out with the demise of the co-efficient system in 2004. The rally replaced the ELPA Rally in Greece which had been cancelled in 2011.

In 2016, the rally didn't take place since the Rallye Club Mühlviertel (responsible for the rally organization) was struggling with lack of candidates to assume the mangament board. The rally restarted in 2018 as a round of the Austrian Rally Championship.

List of winners
Sourced in part from:

References

External links

Official website
European Rally Championship

 
Rally competitions in Austria
European Rally Championship rallies